The cuisine of the United States includes many regional or local dishes, side dishes and foods. This list includes dishes and foods that are associated with specific regions of the United States.



Regional dishes of the United States

Barbecue

Breads and bread dishes

Chicken dishes

Desserts and confectionery

Fish and seafood dishes

Hot dogs and sausages

Pizza

Potato dishes

Rice dishes

Salads

Sandwiches

Soups and stews

Steak dishes

Regional dishes by region

Midwest

Beef Manhattan
Beer brat
Booyah
Broasted chicken
Chicago-style barbecue
Chicago-style hot dog
Chicago-style pizza
Chicken Vesuvio
Chislic
Cincinnati chili
City chicken
Coney
Coney Island hot dog
Detroit-style pizza
Fish boil
Fried cheese curds
Fried-brain sandwich
Goetta
Gooey butter cake
Gerber sandwich
Hoosier-style barbecue
Horseshoe sandwich
Hotdish
Italian beef
Jibarito
Johnny Marzetti
Jucy Lucy
Kansas City-style barbecue
Maxwell Street Polish
Michigan salad
Mother-in-law
Pasty
Pepper and egg sandwich
Pizza puff
Polish Boy
Pork steak
Pork tenderloin sandwich
Quad City-style pizza
Runza
Shaker lemon pie
Shrimp DeJonghe
Slinger
Snickers salad
Springfield-style cashew chicken
Steak de Burgo
St. Louis-style barbecue
St. Louis-style pizza
St. Paul sandwich
Sugar cream pie
Tavern sandwich
Toasted ravioli

Northeast

American chop suey
Anadama bread
Beef on weck
Boston baked beans
Boston cream doughnut
Boston cream pie
Buffalo wings
Cheesesteak
Chicken Divan
Chicken riggies
Chopped cheese
Chow mein sandwich
Clambake
Clam cakes
Clam chowder (Manhattan style)
Clam chowder (New England style)
Clams casino
Delmonico steak
Eggs Benedict
Fluffernutter
Garbage plate
Grandma pizza
Hot milk cake
Italian hot dog
Jersey breakfast dog
Johnnycakes
Lobster Newberg
Lobster roll
Michigan hot dog
Needham
New England boiled dinner
New Haven-style pizza
New York-style pizza
New York System wiener
Parker House roll
Pepperoni roll
Philadelphia Pepper Pot
Pilgrim sandwich
Pit beef sandwich
Pizza bagel
Pork roll
Potatoes O'Brien
Ripper
Salt potatoes
Salt water taffy
Scrapple
Shoofly pie
Sloppy joe
Spiedie
Steak Diane
Steamed cheeseburger
Strawberry rhubarb pie
Stromboli
Stuffies
Submarine sandwich
Sugar on snow
Texas Tommy
Toll House cookie
Tomato pie
Utica greens
Vichyssoise
Waldorf salad
White hot
Whoopie pie

South

Alabama-style barbecue
Bananas Foster
Barbecue spaghetti
Beaten biscuits
Beignet
Biscuits and gravy
Boudin
Brunswick stew
Burgoo
Carolina style hot dog
Charleston red rice
Cheese straws
Chess pie
Chicken fried steak
Chicken Maryland
Chicken mull
Chili con carne
Crab cakes
Cuban sandwich
Dirty rice
Doberge cake
Eggs Sardou
Étouffée
Fried green tomatoes
Frogmore stew
Grillades
Gumbo
Half-smoke
Hoppin' John
Hot brown
Hot chicken
Hot water corn bread
Hummingbird cake
Hushpuppy
Jambalaya
Kentucky jam cake
Key lime pie
King cake
Klobásník
Lane cake
Lemon pepper wings
Lemon stick
Livermush
Memphis-style barbecue
Mississippi mud pie
Modjeska
Moravian chicken pie
Moravian sugar cake
Muffuletta
Natchitoches meat pie
North Carolina-style Barbecue
Oysters Bienville
Oysters en brochette
Oysters Rockefeller
Pecan pie
Pistolette
Po' boy
Red beans and rice
Rice and gravy
Sailor sandwich
Seven-layer salad
She-crab soup
Shrimp and grits
Shrimp Creole
Spoonbread
Sweet potato pie
Tarte à la Bouillie
Texas-style barbecue
Texas toast
Tipsy cake
Yaka mein

Southwest

Arizona cheese crisp
Borracho beans
Carne asada fries
Chimichanga
Cowboy beans
Frito pie
Sonoran hot dog

West

California-style pizza
Chantilly cake
Chili burger
Cioppino
Cobb salad
Crab Louie
Denver sandwich
Dodger Dog
Finger steaks
Fool's Gold Loaf
Fortune cookie
French dip
Frogeye salad
Frozen banana
Frybread
Funeral potatoes
Hangtown fry
Happy Cake
Haupia
Hawaiian haystack
Kulolo
Laulau
Loco moco
Mission burrito
Poke
Santa Maria-style barbecue
Seattle-style hot dog
Shrimp Louie
Sonofabitch stew
Spam musubi
Squid lū'au

Multiple regions

American goulash
Bagel dog
Chicken and waffles
Jo Jo potatoes
Pudding corn
Reuben sandwich
Succotash

See also

 American Chinese cuisine
 Barbecue in the United States
 Cajun cuisine
 Carolina style
 Cuisine of the Midwestern United States
 Cuisine of New England
 Cuisine of New Orleans
 Cuisine of New York City
 Cuisine of the Pacific Northwest
 Cuisine of the Pennsylvania Dutch
 Cuisine of Philadelphia
 Cuisine of the Southern United States
 Cuisine of the Southwestern United States
 Cuisine of the Thirteen Colonies
 Cuisine of the Western United States
 Hawaii regional cuisine
 Native cuisine of Hawaii

 Hot dog variations § United States
 Italian-American cuisine
 List of American foods
 List of American regional and fusion cuisines
 List of regional beverages of the United States
 Louisiana Creole cuisine
 Lowcountry cuisine
 Native American cuisine
 Pizza in the United States
 Puerto Rican cuisine
 Soul food
 List of soul foods and dishes
 Tex-Mex
 Traditional food

References

Regional